Kelly Sildaru (born 17 February 2002) is an Estonian Olympic freestyle skier.

Biography
Sildaru won a gold medal in the slopestyle event in the 2016 Winter X Games beating Tiril Sjåstad Christiansen. With this win, at age 13, Sildaru became the youngest gold medalist to date at a Winter X Games event and the first person to win a Winter X Games medal for Estonia. She is also the youngest to win two X Games gold medals. Sildaru has won the women's slopestyle on the 2015 and 2016 Dew Tour.

During the Big Air competition of the 2017 Winter X Games Norway, Sildaru became the first woman ever to land a Switch 1260 ° Mute and a 1440° during a competition. Because of her young age, the first World Cup event she was allowed to participate in was on 27 August 2017 in Cardrona, New Zealand. She won the slopestyle competition.

Despite being the gold medal favorite for the women’s slopestyle event in 2018 Winter Olympics, she missed competing in the Games because of a knee injury. However she later recovered and was able to compete in the world championships winning gold in halfpipe. In the 2020 Youth Olympic Games she won a gold medal for the Women's Freestyle Skiing.

During the 2022 Beijing Winter Olympics, she won a bronze medal in the slopestyle event with her top score of 82.06 in her first run.

Sildaru has been named the female Estonian Athlete of the Year twice (2019, 2022), and is the recipient of a high Estonian state award, the Order of the White Star, 3rd class.

Freestyle skiing results
All results are sourced from the International Ski Federation (FIS).

Olympic Games
1 medal – (1 bronze)

Winter Youth Olympics
1 medal – (1 gold)

World Championships

1 medal – (1 gold)

Junior World Championships
7 medals – (6 gold, 1 silver)

Winter X Games
9 medals – (6 gold, 2 silver, 1 bronze)

Winter X Games Europe
1 medal – (1 silver)

World Cup results 

Sildaru ended the 2021-2022 World Cup season by winning the FIS World Cup slopestyle title and taking home her first crystal globe.

Season standings

Standings through 19 December 2022

Race Podiums
 6 wins – (5 SS, 1 HP)
 13 podiums – (6 SS, 6 HP, 1 BA)

Trivia 
Sildaru was honored with a one-of-a-kind Kelly Sildaru Barbie doll on 25 May 2022 as part of Barbie's Dream Gap project.

References

External links

 
 
 
 
Estonian Ski Association Profile
Official website
Biography (in Estonian)

 

2002 births
Living people
Estonian female freestyle skiers
Sportspeople from Tallinn
X Games athletes
Freestyle skiers at the 2020 Winter Youth Olympics
Youth Olympic gold medalists for Estonia
Freestyle skiers at the 2022 Winter Olympics
Olympic freestyle skiers of Estonia
Medalists at the 2022 Winter Olympics
Olympic bronze medalists for Estonia
Olympic medalists in freestyle skiing
Recipients of the Order of the White Star, 3rd Class